Katie Bernhardt is an American politician and businessperson. She has served as the chair of the Louisiana Democratic Party since September 2020.

Career 
Bernhardt graduated from Louisiana State University Law Center. Bernhadt and her husband operate Standard Law in Lafayette, Louisiana. She served as a member on the Democratic state central committee and executive committee for four years. 

In September 2020, Bernhardt was elected to a four year term as the chair of the Louisiana Democratic Party 127 to 51 against Lynda Woolard, a party organizer. She succeeded Karen Carter Peterson. Bernhardt campaigned on her ability to reverse the party's decline in the state and appeal to moderate and rural voters. She has addressed the North and South divide in Louisiana Democratic politics. Bernhardt has stated she aims to modernize the party. She established the Louisiana Democratic disability caucus and the Democratic women's caucus. She has reinstituted groups for young Democrats.

In January 2023, Bernhardt signaled interest but did not officially announce that she would run in the 2023 Louisiana gubernatorial election. Her political advertisement sparked criticism among some party members, prompting first vice chairman C. Travis Johnson to stepdown. She also faced calls to resign, mainly from progressives while other party members came to her defense. In February 2023, Bernhardt announced that she was not running in the gubernatorial election.

Bernhardt has four children.

References

21st-century American businesspeople
21st-century American businesswomen
21st-century American lawyers
21st-century American women lawyers
21st-century American women politicians
Businesspeople from Louisiana
Living people
Louisiana lawyers
Louisiana State Democratic Chairmen
Louisiana State University Law Center alumni
Place of birth missing (living people)
Politicians from Lafayette, Louisiana
Women in Louisiana politics
Year of birth missing (living people)